Gennaro Ursino (1650-1715) was an Italian composer and teacher. He was senior teacher at the Conservatorio della Pietà dei Turchini from 1675 to 1705. His teachers included Giovanni Salvatore (ca. 1610–1688), and his students included Gaetano Greco, phonemes and others.

References

Italian Baroque composers
1650 births
1715 deaths
Italian male classical composers
18th-century Italian composers
18th-century Italian male musicians